Sir Frederick Cecil Mason  (15 May 1913 – 18 January 2008) was a British diplomat.

During the Second World War, the British occupied the Danish Faroe Islands following Nazi Germany's invasion of Denmark, with Mason serving as the British Consul to the Faroe Islands. He married a local woman, Karen Rorholm. They subsequently left the Faroe Islands. In 1943, he was appointed British Consul in Colón, Panama. He would later, as Sir Frederick Mason CMG, become British Ambassador to Chile (1966-1970) and finally British Permanent Representative to the Geneva Office of the United Nations (1971-1973).

References

External links
Photograph dated 1 April 1971

1913 births
2008 deaths
Alumni of St Catharine's College, Cambridge
Ambassadors of the United Kingdom to Chile
Knights Commander of the Royal Victorian Order
Companions of the Order of St Michael and St George
People educated at the City of London School